The 2009 AF2 season was the AF2's 10th and final season. It was preceded by 2008. The regular season began on Friday, March 20 and finished on Saturday, July 25.  The league champion was the Spokane Shock, who defeated the Wilkes-Barre/Scranton Pioneers 74-27 in ArenaCup X.

League info

Standings
Through Week 18

 Green indicates clinched playoff berth
 Purple indicates division champion
 Gray indicates best conference record

Playoffs

ArenaCup X

ArenaCup X was the tenth and final edition of arenafootball2's championship game in which the National Conference Champions Spokane Shock defeated the American Conference Champions Wilkes-Barre/Scranton Pioneers, 74–27. The game was held on Saturday, August 22, 2009. As part of the league's tenth anniversary celebrations, the game was held at the neutral-site Orleans Arena (within the Orleans Resort & Casino) in Las Vegas.

Because of legal issues regarding the ownership of arenafootball2 (the original Arena Football League had owned a controlling stake), the league legally disbanded two weeks after the game was played because of the parent's bankruptcy.  AF2's board of directors formed a new entity, Arena Football One, that assumed the Arena Football League identity after winning a bankruptcy court sale in late 2009.  Future championships for that league which, while "new", consists of AF2's board of directors, use the ArenaBowl as its championship, leading to the retirement of the ArenaCup.

The "new" Arena Football League began in 2010 with the defending champion Shock moving up. They went on to defeat the Tampa Bay Storm in ArenaBowl XXIII, thus winning consecutive titles in the premier level in consecutive years, with different league identities.

References

External links
2009 af2 stats

Af2 seasons
Arena